Guidance may refer to:

Arts and media
 Guidance (album), by American instrumental rock band Russian Circles
 Guidance (film), a Canadian comedy film released in 2014 
 Guidance (web series), a 2015–2017 American web series
 "Guidance", an episode of Death Note
 Guidance Recordings, a record label

Spirituality
 Spiritual practices
 Guidance by animal spirits, totems or symbolism; see Spiritualism
 Spiritual guidance by a guru

Other uses
 Guidance (finance), a corporation's prediction of its near-future profit or loss
 Guidance system, devices used for navigation
 Guidance Solutions, an eCommerce development company
 Guidance Software, a company that provides software for digital investigations

See also
 Guide
 
 
 Advice (disambiguation)